Doug Lionel Sax (April 26, 1936 – April 2, 2015) was an American mastering engineer from Los Angeles, California. He mastered three of The Doors' albums, including their 1967 debut; six of Pink Floyd's albums, including The Wall; Ray Charles' multiple-Grammy winner Genius Loves Company in 2004, and Bob Dylan's 36th studio album Shadows in the Night in 2015.

Early life
Sax was born in Los Angeles on April 26, 1936, to Mildred and Remy Sax. While attending Fairfax High School in West Los Angeles, Sax played the trumpet alongside trumpeter Herb Alpert. Upon graduation, Sax attended University of California, Los Angeles and then was drafted into the Army where he played trumpet in the Seventh Army Symphony Orchestra from 1959 to 1961.

Career

From an early age, Sax was interested in recorded sound, and although he had established a career as a symphonic trumpeter, on December 27, 1967, along with Lincoln Mayorga, a friend from junior high who had become a music arranger and pianist for Capitol Records, and Sax's older brother Sherwood (Bert), an engineer, he opened The Mastering Lab. One of the first big albums Sax mastered at The Mastering Lab was The Doors' debut album which was inducted into the Library of Congress on March 25, 2015.

The Mastering Lab uses equipment designed by Sherwood, which features handcrafted electronics, from the tape machines to the equalizers, compressors / limiters, A/D - D/A converters, and monitoring amplifiers. That, combined with his ears and expertise, helped Sax forge a long and successful career at The Mastering Lab. In 1970, Sax and Mayorga founded Sheffield Lab Recordings, an audiophile label which produced direct-to-disc classical and jazz albums.

In the 1970s, he helped establish the audiophile record company Sheffield Lab, with his friend Lincoln Mayorga.  Known for their Direct-To-Disk and Live to 2-track recordings, they recorded such artists as Dave Grusin, Thelma Houston, Harry James, James Newton Howard, Michael Ruff, Pat Coil, and Clair Marlo.

By 1972, Sax was mastering 20% of the top 100 chart in Billboard magazine. Albums mastered by Sax and released in 1971 included such titles as The Who's Who's Next, Harry Nilsson's Nilsson Schmilsson, The Rolling Stones' Sticky Fingers and the Eagles' debut album. During his career, Sax cut  thousands of LP masters with his custom designed, all-tube signal path including Pink Floyd's The Wall (and all subsequent Pink Floyd releases up to 2014's The Endless River), the reissue of the Slayer thrash metal group's Vinyl Conflict box set and Pantera vinyl reissues, the Eagles' Greatest Hits, and Brian Wilson Reimagines Gershwin.

Death
Sax died in Los Angeles on April 2, 2015, aged 78, from cancer.

Recording engineer and producer Al Schmitt released a statement on Sax's death:

Awards
Grammy Awards
2004 - Technical Grammy Award
2005 - Grammy Award for Best 5.1 Surround Sound Album for Genius Loves Company
2005 - Grammy Award for Album of the Year for Genius Loves Company
2005 - Grammy Award for Record of the Year for Genius Loves Company

TEC Awards
Sax has been nominated seven times for the Mix Foundation TEC Awards for Creative Achievement, winning twice for:

  2002 -  Record Production/Album -  Look of Love, Diana Krall
  2005 - Record Production/Album - Genius Loves Company, Ray Charles

AES (Audio Engineer Society) Lifetime Honorary Membership Award

Selected works
 1967 Lincoln Mayorga and Distinguished Colleagues - Lincoln Mayorga
 1967 The Doors - The Doors
 1967 Absolutely Free - Frank Zappa
 1970 Morrison Hotel - The Doors
 1971 Fillmore East: June 1971 Frank Zappa
 1971 L.A. Woman - The Doors
 1971 Sticky Fingers- The Rolling Stones
 1971 Who's Next - The Who
 1971 Nilsson Schmilsson - Harry Nilsson
 1971 Songs for Beginners - Graham Nash
 1972 Exile on Main St. - The Rolling Stones
 1972 No Secrets - Carly Simon
 1972 Will the Circle Be Unbroken - Nitty Gritty Dirt Band
 1973 Crazy Eyes - Poco
 1973 Living in the Material World - George Harrison
 1973 Muscle of Love - Alice Cooper
 1973 Ringo - Ringo Starr
 1973 Takin' My Time - Bonnie Raitt
 1974 Seven - Poco
 1974 The Way We Were - Barbra Streisand
 1975 Ambrosia - Ambrosia
 1975 Andrew Gold - Andrew Gold
 1975 Equinox - Styx
 1975 Prisoner in Disguise - Linda Ronstadt
 1975 Toys in the Attic - Aerosmith
 1975 The Who by Numbers - The Who
 1976 Chicago X - Chicago
 1976 Breezin' - George Benson
 1976 Glow - Al Jarreau
 1976 Silk Degrees - Boz Scaggs
 1976 The Art of Tea - Michael Franks
 1977 A Place in the Sun - Pablo Cruise
 1977 Running on Empty - Jackson Browne
 1978 David Gilmour - David Gilmour (the 2006 remaster)
 1978 Studio Tan - Frank Zappa
 1978 You Don't Bring Me Flowers - Neil Diamond
 1979 The Glow - Bonnie Raitt
 1979 The Wall - Pink Floyd
 1980 Mad Love - Linda Ronstadt
 1980 Stand in the Fire - Warren Zevon
 1980 The Jazz Singer - Neil Diamond
 1981 A Collection of Great Dance Songs - Pink Floyd
 1981 The Brothers Johnson -  Winners 
 1981 El Rayo-X - David Lindley
 1981 Mistaken Identity - Kim Carnes
 1982 All Four One - The Motels
 1982 Desire - Tom Scott
 1982 Get Closer - Linda Ronstadt
 1982 It's Hard - The Who
 1982 Toto IV - Toto
 1982 Voyeur - Kim Carnes
 1982 Win This Record - David Lindley & El Rayo-X
 1982 ...Famous Last Words... - Supertramp
 1983 Caught in the Game - Survivor
 1983 The Final Cut - Pink Floyd
 1983 What's New - Linda Ronstadt
 1984 Building the Perfect Beast - Don Henley
 1984 Love Language - Teddy Pendergrass 
 1984 Lush Life - Linda Ronstadt
 1984 About Face - David Gilmour
 1984 The Pros and Cons of Hitch Hiking - Roger Waters
 1985 Whitney Houston - Whitney Houston
 1986 'Round Midnight with Nelson Riddle and His Orchestra - Linda Ronstadt
 1986 Double Vision - Bob James
 1986 Every Beat of My Heart - Rod Stewart
 1986 For Sentimental Reasons - Linda Ronstadt
 1986 Innocent Eyes - Graham Nash
 1986 Lives in the Balance - Jackson Browne
 1986 Nine Lives - Bonnie Raitt
 1986 Tutu - Miles Davis
 1987 A Momentary Lapse of Reason - Pink Floyd
 1987 Canciones de Mi Padre - Linda Ronstadt
 1987 Collaboration - George Benson & Earl Klugh
 1987 In My Tribe - 10,000 Maniacs
 1987 I Prefer the Moonlight - Kenny Rogers
 1988 Back to Avalon - Kenny Loggins
 1988 Let It Go - Clair Marlo
 1988 Everything - The Bangles
 1988 Old 8×10 - Randy Travis
 1988 One More Story - Peter Cetera
 1988 Other Roads - Boz Scaggs
 1988 Power - Tower of Power
 1988 Delicate Sound of Thunder - Pink Floyd
 1988 See the Light - Jeff Healey
 1988 Slow Turning - John Hiatt
 1988 The Seventh One - Toto
 1988 This Note's for You - Neil Young
 1988 Very Greasy - David Lindley
 1989 Amandla - Miles Davis
 1989 New Pants - Flim & the BB's
 1989 Nick of Time - Bonnie Raitt
 1989 Spellbound - Joe Sample
 1989 World in Motion - Jackson Browne
 1990 Ashes to Ashes - Joe Sample 
 1990 The Language of Life - Everything but the Girl
 1990 Blue Pacific - Michael Franks
 1990 Heroes and Friends - Randy Travis
 1990 Inside Out - Chick Corea Elektric Band
 1990 Neck and Neck - Chet Atkins
 1990 Ringo Starr and His All-Starr Band - Ringo Starr
 1990 Some People's Lives - Bette Midler
 1990 That's What - Leo Kottke
 1991 Back Home Again - Kenny Rogers
 1991 Carry On - Patti Austin
 1991 Divinyls - Divinyls
 1991 For the Boys - Bette Midler
 1991 Great Big Boy - Leo Kottke
 1991 Hard at Play - Huey Lewis and the News
 1991 Leap of Faith - Kenny Loggins
 1991 Luck of the Draw - Bonnie Raitt
 1991 Monster on a Leash - Tower of Power
 1991 Shake Me Up - Little Feat
 1991 The Prince of Tides - James Newton Howard
 1991 Warm Your Heart - Aaron Neville
 1992 Amused to Death - Roger Waters
 1992 Home for Christmas - Amy Grant
 1992 Joshua Judges Ruth - Lyle Lovett
 1992 Shine On - Pink Floyd
 1993 Across the Borderline - Willie Nelson
 1993 A Single Woman - Nina Simone
 1993 Breaking Silence - Janis Ian
 1993 Duets - Frank Sinatra
 1993 I'm Alive - Jackson Browne
 1993 Live - James Taylor
 1993 Stepping Out - Diana Krall
 1993 Thousand Roads - David Crosby
 1993 Time for Mercy - Jann Arden
 1993 Traffic from Paradise - Rickie Lee Jones
 1993 Unknown Road - Pennywise
 1993 Unplugged...and Seated - Rod Stewart
 1993 What's Love Got to Do With It - Tina Turner
 1994 After the Storm - Crosby, Stills & Nash
 1994 Cohen Live - Leonard Cohen
 1994 The Division Bell - Pink Floyd (with James Guthrie)
 1994 Crimson and Blue - Phil Keaggy
 1994 Have a Little Faith - Joe Cocker
 1994 I Love Everybody - Lyle Lovett
 1994 Pink Floyd back catalog remastering
 1994 Peter Frampton - Peter Frampton
 1994 Rhythm of Love - Anita Baker
 1994 This is Me - Randy Travis
 1995 Feels Like Home - Linda Ronstadt
 1995 Only Trust Your Heart - Diana Krall
 1995 PULSE - Pink Floyd
 1996 In My Lifetime - Neil Diamond
 1996 Jo Dee Messina - Jo Dee Messina
 1996 Peace on Earth - Kitaro
 1996 Signs of Life - Steven Curtis Chapman
 1996 The Road to Ensenada - Lyle Lovett
 1996 Broken China - Rick Wright
 1997 1+1 - Herbie Hancock and Wayne Shorter
 1997 Across from Midnight - Joe Cocker
 1997 American Landscape - David Benoit
 1997 Artist of My Soul - Sandi Patty
 1997 East West - Julia Fordham
 1997 Everywhere - Tim McGraw
 1997 Love Among the Ruins - 10,000 Maniacs
 1997 Love Scenes - Diana Krall
 1997 Message for Albert - Five for Fighting
 1997 So Long So Wrong - Alison Krauss & Union Station
 1997 Kyle Vincent - Kyle Vincent
 1998 Faith - Faith Hill
 1998 Gaia - Kitaro
 1998 Hell Among the Yearlings - Gillian Welch
 1998 I'm Alright - Jo Dee Messina
 1998 Sittin' On Top of the World - LeAnn Rimes
 1998 Trio II - Emmylou Harris
 1999 Breathe - Faith Hill
 1999 Forget About It - Alison Krauss
 1999 One Guitar, No Vocals - Leo Kottke
 1999 The Grass Is Blue - Dolly Parton
 1999 The Song Lives On - Lalah Hathaway
 1999 The Whole SHeBANG - SHeDAISY
 1999 Tight Rope - Brooks & Dunn
 1999 Twenty Four Seven - Tina Turner
 2000 In the Flesh – Live - Roger Waters
 2000 Is There Anybody Out There? The Wall Live 1980-81 - Pink Floyd
 2000 Live at Yoshi's - Dee Dee Bridgewater
 2000 More Songs from Pooh Corner - Kenny Loggins
 2000 Nickel Creek - Nickel Creek
 2001 Big Wide Grin - Keb' Mo' 
 2001 Love, Shelby - Shelby Lynne
 2001 Outside Inside - The String Cheese Incident
 2001 Set This Circus Down - Tim McGraw
 2001 This Way - Jewel
 2001 Trouble in Shangri-La - Stevie Nicks
 2001 Echoes: The Best of Pink Floyd - Pink Floyd (with James Guthrie)
 2002 Alice - Tom Waits
 2002 At the Movies - Sting
 2002 Cry - Faith Hill
 2002 Home - Dixie Chicks
 2002 Songs for Survivors - Graham Nash
 2002 This Is New - Dee Dee Bridgewater
 2003 A Thousand Kisses Deep - Chris Botti
 2003 Live - Béla Fleck
 2003 Smile - Lyle Lovett
 2004 Crosby & Nash - Graham Nash
 2004 Genius Loves Company - Ray Charles
 2004 Heart & Soul - Joe Cocker
 2004 The Chronicles of Life and Death - Good Charlotte
 2005 Hillbilly Deluxe - Brooks & Dunn
 2005 Hope and Desire - Susan Tedeschi
 2005 Jagged Little Pill Acoustic - Alanis Morissette
 2005 Jann Arden - Jann Arden
 2005 Overtime - Lee Ritenour
 2005 The Great American Songbook - Rod Stewart
 2006 Like Red on a Rose - Alan Jackson
 2006 Love, Pain & the Whole Crazy Thing - Keith Urban
 2006 After The Morning - Cara Dillon
 2006 On an Island - David Gilmour (with James Guthrie)
 2007 Grapefruit Moon, the Songs of Tom Waits - Southside Johnny with LaBamba's Jazz Orchestra
 2007 Dirt Farmer - Levon Helm
 2008 Solo Acoustic, Vol 1&2 - Jackson Browne
 2008 Live in Gdańsk - David Gilmour
 2008 Still Unforgettable - Natalie Cole
 2009 Anything Goes - Herb Alpert
 2009 Breakthrough - Colbie Caillat
 2009 Electric Dirt - Levon Helm
 2009 Free - Jann Arden
 2009 Love Is the Answer - Barbra Streisand
 2010 Live at the Troubadour - Carole King
 2010 Songs from the Road - Leonard Cohen
 2011 Midnight Sun - Dee Dee Bridgewater
 2011 Pink Floyd vinyl remasters of The Dark Side of the Moon, Wish You Were Here and The Wall
 2012 Kisses on the Bottom - Paul McCartney
 2013 Back to Brooklyn - Barbra Streisand
 2014 Live in Dublin - Leonard Cohen
 2014 Croz - David Crosby
 2014 The Endless River - Pink Floyd (vinyl edition)
 2015 Shadows in the Night - Bob Dylan

References

External links

Doug Sax Interview NAMM Oral History Library (2012)

1936 births
2015 deaths
People from Greater Los Angeles
Grammy Award winners
Mastering engineers
United States Army soldiers
Deaths from cancer in California
University of California, Los Angeles alumni
Fairfax High School (Los Angeles) alumni